Abhaya may refer to:

People with the name

Historical
 Abhaya of Upatissa Nuwara, king of Upathissa Nuwara from 474 to 454 BCE
 Abhaya Malla (died 1255), Malla Dynasty king of Nepal
 Abhaya Naga of Anuradhapura (reigned 237–245 CE)
 Amandagamani Abhaya of Anuradhapura (reigned 21–30 CE)
 Bhatikabhaya Abhaya of Anuradhapura (reigned 20 BCE9 CE)
 Dutugamunu (reigned 161–137 BCE), Sri Lankan king also known as Dutthagamani Abhaya
 Valagamba of Anuradhapura (reigned after 103 BCE), also known as Vattagamani Abhaya

Modern
 Sister Abhaya, the victim in the 1992 Sister Abhaya murder case of Kottayam, Kerala
 Abhaya Indrayan (born 1945), Indian biostatistician
 Abhaya Induruwa (born 1950), Sri Lankan computer scientist
 Abhaya Simha (born 1981), Kannada film director
 Abhaya Subba, Nepalese singer-songwriter and musician

Other uses
 Abhaya (film), a 2017 film
 Abhayamudra, a symbolic or ritual gesture in Hinduism and Buddhism
 Abhaya: The Legend of Diwali, a book on a princess of fictional city Anagha.

See also
 Abhay (disambiguation)
 Abhayagiri (disambiguation)

Sinhalese masculine given names